The 2017 EAFF E-1 Football Championship will be the 6th edition of the women's tournament in EAFF E-1 Football Championship, the women's football championship of East Asia. It was held in Japan in 2017.

Team allocation
Based on FIFA Women's world ranking on March 25, 2016, ten teams were allocated to their particular stage. Each winner of the preliminary round progressed to the next stage.

Venues

First preliminary round
The first preliminary round was held in Guam.

Table

Matches
All times are local (UTC+10).

Awards

Second preliminary round

The second preliminary round was held from 8–14 November 2016 in Hong Kong.

Table

Matches
All times are local (UTC+8).

Awards

Final tournament

The final competition was held in Japan from 8 to 15 December 2017.

Squads

Table

Matches

All times are local (UTC+9).

Awards

Goals

4 goals

 Kim Yun-mi

2 goals

 Mina Tanaka

1 goals

 Ren Guixin
 Wang Shanshan
 Emi Nakajima

 Mana Iwabuchi
 Ri Hyang-sim
 Cho So-hyun

 Han Chae-rin
 Kang Yu-mi

 1 own goals

 Kim Do-yeon

Final ranking

Per statistical convention in football, matches decided in extra time are counted as wins and losses, while matches decided by penalty shoot-out are counted as draws.

Broadcasting rights
: CCTV, PPTV and Guangdong Sports
: Fuji TV
: SPOTV

References

2017
East Asian Cup
East Asian Cup
International association football competitions hosted by Japan
EAFF
2017 in women's association football